Caloptilia leptophanes is a moth of the family Gracillariidae. It is known from Nigeria and South Africa.

The wingspan is about 10 mm. The forewings are dark iridescent purple with five slender shining whitish-yellow transverse fasciae, the first towards the base, irregular, the second at one-third, strongest, rather oblique, the third postmedian, direct, the fourth at three-fourths, reduced to slight irroration and the fifth towards the apex, attenuated beneath. There is a whitish-yellow apical speck. The hindwings are dark grey.

References

leptophanes
Insects of West Africa
Moths of Africa
Moths described in 1918